James Forsyth (born 1981) is a British political aide and former political journalist. After serving as political editor of The Spectator magazine since 2009, he was appointed Political Secretary to the Prime Minister of the United Kingdom by Rishi Sunak in December 2022.

Early life
Forsyth attended Winchester College and Jesus College, Cambridge.

Career 
Forsyth joined Foreign Policy magazine as assistant editor before launching Coffee House, The Spectators political blog, in 2007. He was appointed deputy editor, online, of The Spectator in 2008 and political editor in 2009.

He is also a weekly columnist for The Times on a Friday, previously writing for The Sun on Saturdays and previously the Mail on Sunday.

He is an advisory board member of the ResPublica think tank in Westminster.

On 24 December 2022, Forsyth was hired by Prime Minister Rishi Sunak as his political secretary.

Personal life
Forsyth has been married to the journalist Allegra Stratton since 2011. She was appointed as the Downing Street Press Secretary under Prime Minister Boris Johnson in November 2020. They live in Canonbury in Islington with their two children. 

He is close friends with Prime Minister and Conservative Party leader Rishi Sunak; they were contemporaries at Winchester College and are godparents to each other's children. Sunak was best man at Forsyth's wedding to Stratton in 2011.

References

External links 
 James Forsyth The Spectator

1981 births
Living people
British male journalists
Alumni of Jesus College, Cambridge
People educated at Winchester College
The Spectator people